Ciera may refer to:

People

Given name
 Ciera Payton (born 1986), American actress and writer
 Ciera Rogers (born 1987), American business owner, model, and fashion designer
 Ciera Davis, victim in the Hart family murders
 Ciera Eastin, Survivor: Blood vs. Water contestant

Surname
 Giacomo Ciera, Roman Catholic prelate
 Ippolito Ciera (fl. 1546–1561), Italian composer

Other uses
 Oldsmobile Cutlass Ciera, a 1981–1996 American mid-size car

See also
 Ciara (disambiguation)
 Cierra (disambiguation)
 Sierra (disambiguation)